William Morton Massey (11 April 1846 – 19 April 1899) was an English cricketer who played first-class cricket for Somerset in 1882 and for Lancashire in 1883. He was born in Manchester (then in Lancashire, England) and died in New York City, United States.

Massey was a middle-order batsman who played cricket for Somerset teams in the years immediately before the county club was granted first-class status in 1882; he also played for other amateur sides, such as the "Gentlemen of Devon" in this period. His sole first-class appearance for Somerset came in 1882, and the following year he made a single first-class appearance for Lancashire, for whom he was qualified by birth. He was not successful in either of his first-class games, his highest score being just 5.

After the mid-1880s, Massey was resident in New York. He played cricket into the mid-1890s for the Staten Island Athletic Club in league and local matches against, for example, the Staten Island Cricket Club.

References

1846 births
1899 deaths
English cricketers
Lancashire cricketers
Somerset cricketers